Maragatha Veenai is a 2014 Indian Tamil-language soap opera that aired on Sun TV. The show ran from 27 January 2012 to 1 December 2017 and aired Monday through Saturday for 1102 episodes. The show starred Santhoshi, Kumar, Sangeetha, Raja, Manokaran, Deepa and among others. This show was produced by Cine Time Entertainment and directed by L.Muthukumaraswamy, P.Selvam, O.N Rathnam and Vasubharthi Shivashankaran for 1102episodes. It also airs in Sri Lanka Tamil Channel on Shakthi TV.

Synopsis  
The main story of Maragatha Veenai serial lies on two protagonists, namely Divya and Shankar. The serial captures their relationship and how the duo faces challenges to come up in life. Neema is a woman who decides to start her life anew and live a happy life. However, she faces many challenges, hurdles and problems that compel her to hide her identity from the world and go on with her life.

Divya, a young girl, faces several problems when she tries to fight for independence from the life that was forced upon her.

Cast

Main cast
 Neema (2012-Mar.2013) → Reshma Pasupuleti (2013-Jan.2015) → Santhoshi (2015-2017) as Divya
 L.Muthukumarsamy as Raja
 Sangeetha Sheedy as Kavitha 
 Ramya as Saraswathi
 Sreeja as Kathiravaselvi (1-321)
Poorni as Jyothi

Recurring cast

 Deepa Shankar as Dhanam, Raja's mother
 Manokaran as Subhu
 Apsara as Radha
 Navindhar as Navin 
 Fawaz Zayani as ACP Karuppusamy
 Kumar
 Shyam Sundhar/Kurinji Nathan as Madhavan
 Sailasri
 K. R. Selvaraj
 Issac Verghese
 Alex Pandiyan
 Krithiga
 Saif as Krishnan, Radha's husband 
 Sudharshan
 Geetha Ravi Shankar as Bhagyalaksmi
 Raja as Shankar, sarsu's brother
 Divya Bharathi as Gayathri
 Vetrivelan as Suresh
 Kumaresan as Raja's uncle
 Thilla as Divya's father (Died in serial)
 Sharadha Nayaki/ Deepika as Parvathi
 Shiva Ranjani /Ganga as Rekha
 Udhay 
 --- as Raja's father
 Durai Raj as Raghu
 Hema Rajkumar as Nandhini
 Jenooya as Nimmi/Nirmala
 Pandan/Sundrapandian 
 Subramani
 Divya Krishnan

Original soundtrack

Title song
It was written by Yugabharathi, composed by Kiran and Re Recording by Dhina. It was sung by Hariharasudhan.

Soundtrack

International broadcast
The Series was released on 27 January 2014 on Sun TV, the series also airs on Sun TV HD. The Show was also broadcast internationally on Channel's international distribution. It airs in Sri Lanka, Singapore, Malaysia, South East Asia, Middle East, United States, Canada, Europe, Oceania, South Africa and Sub Saharan Africa on Sun TV. The show's episodes were released on YouTube channel as Cine Times

See also
 List of programs broadcast by Sun TV

References

External links
 Official Website 

Sun TV original programming
2010s Tamil-language television series
2014 Tamil-language television series debuts
Tamil-language television shows
2017 Tamil-language television series endings